Emilio Dulio (May 21, 1859 – 1950) was an Italian politician. He was twice colonial governor of Italian Somaliland (1897, 1898-1905).

Bibliography
 
 
 
 

1859 births
1950 deaths
20th-century Italian politicians
People from Borgomanero